Rahasya Police is a 2009 Indian Malayalam-language crime thriller film by K. Madhu starring Jayaram. It also features Samvrutha Sunil, Shivani Bhai, Sindhu Menon and Ayilya.The filim was box office flopp.

Synopsis 
In the village of Paravathipuram, Kaimal and Parambath Raju are fighting over a number of issues and get involved in the murder of a girl, Bhadra. Two police officers who are alike, S.I. Rajan and Rajamani IPS, investigate the case.

Cast 
 Jayaram as S. I. Rajan / Rajamani IPS (dual role) 
 Samvrutha Sunil as Maya
 Sindhu Menon as S.I. Rajan's Wife
 Shivani Bhai as Manikutty
 Mangala as Bhadra
 Ananya as Bhama
 Suresh Krishna as Police Officer
 Jagathy Sreekumar as Kunnath Kaimal
 Ganesh as Parambath Raju 
 Riyaz Khan as Keshu
 Devi Chandana as Bhama's aunt
 Harishree Ashokan as Arjunan
 Sudheesh as S.I. Thomas
 Suraj Venjaramood as S.I. Prakash
 Indrans as Raveendran
 Mala Aravindan as Pushpan
 Rajeev Parameshwar as Sasi, the lover
 Mini Arun
 Deepika Mohan
 Manka Mahesh

External links 
 
 http://www.zonkerala.com/magazine/rahasya-police-review-102.html
 https://web.archive.org/web/20090802172334/http://www.cinecurry.com/movie/malayalam/rahasya-police
 http://movies.rediff.com/report/2009/jul/27/malayalam-film-review-rahasya-police.htm
 http://www.nowrunning.com/movie/6639/malayalam/rahasya-police/index.htm
 http://www.cinepicks.com/malayalam/gallery/rahasya-police/ayilya-samvrutha-mangala-sivani.html

2009 films
2000s Malayalam-language films
Films directed by K. Madhu